Parliamentary elections were held in Greece on 14 May 1865. Supporters of Alexandros Koumoundouros emerged as the largest bloc in Parliament, holding 95 of the 170 seats. Koumoundouros remained Prime Minister until 1 November, when he was replaced by Epameinondas Deligiorgis.

Results

References

Greece
Parliamentary elections in Greece
Legislative
Greece
1860s in Greek politics